The Ayoluengo oil field is an oil field located in Sargentes de la Lora, Province of Burgos. Ayoluengo is the only onshore commercial oil field of Spain (and the only one in the entire Iberian Peninsula).

History
The Ayoluengo oil field was discovered in June 1964 by Amospain (joint venture Chevron, Texaco, Campsa). It was developed by Leni Oil & Gas. It began production in 1967 and produces oil.

The field produced 17 million barrels of oil from 1967 to 2017, year when the concession of the field expired and a new bid was to be organized. The output sometimes peaked at 5,000 barrels a day, but by 2014, it was around 100 barrels a day.

The lands for the oil production were expropriated from the local inhabitants. The region did not benefit economically from the Ayoluengo oil field.

Geology
The 10 km2 field consists of a Triassic salt-cored anticline with 200 m of vertical closure.  Oil and gas are produced from more than 50 lenticular sandstone bodies of Late Jurassic to Early Cretaceous age.  These sandstone bodies lie at a depth of at least 1300 m.  The last well was drilled in 1990, making for a total of 52.  Only 10 wells were active by 2016, when the cumulative production had reached 17 million barrels of oil.

References

Oil fields in Spain